Liriope (minor planet designation: 414 Liriope) is a large Main belt asteroid. It is classified as a C-type asteroid and is probably composed of carbonaceous material.

It was discovered by Auguste Charlois on 16 January 1896 in Nice.

References

External links
 
 

Background asteroids
Liriope
Liriope
C-type asteroids (Tholen)
Cg-type asteroids (SMASS)
18960116